Various given names and surnames are used among Sindhis in Pakistan, India, and the Sindhi diaspora.

Naming convention 
Most Sindhi family names are a modified form of a patronymic and typically end with the suffix -ani, which is used to denote descent from a common male ancestor. One explanation states that the -ani suffix is a Sindhi variant of 'anshi', derived from the Sanskrit word 'ansh', which means 'descended from'. The first part of a Sindhi surname is usually derived from the name or location of an ancestor. In northern Sindh, surnames ending in 'ja' (meaning 'of') are also common. A person's surname would consist of the name of his or her native village, followed by 'ja'. Sindhis generally add the suffix ‘ani’ to the name of a great-grandfather and adopt the name as a family name.

Sindhi surnames 
Sindhi surnames are commonly associated with tribes.
 Dahri
 Nohri
 Vellani
 Mirbahar
 Adani
 Advani
 Agahni
 Ahuja
 Anandani
Aahooja
 Jewani
 Amersy
 Ambani
 Ambwani
 Arora
 Achhra
Aarijo
Aarisar
Aswani
Bablani
Bakhru
Boolani
Phulapota
Channa
Chanchalani
Mallah
Machhi
Mochi
Mangria
Sawand
Kolachi
Koreja
Banani
 Badlani 
 Bajaj
 Bapar
 Bhagwani
 Bhaglani
 Bhagnani
 Bhambhani
 Bhangar
 Bhatt 
 Bhatti 
 Bhatia
 Balani
 Bhavnani
 Bhayo
 Bakharwani
 Bhel
 Bhil
 Boobdabaani
 Bajeer
 Bhutto
 Bijarani
 Bijlani
 Bilwani
 Binyani
 Biyani
 Bodani
 Brahmkhatri
 Buller
 Chaniya
Chachar
 Channa
 Choithani
 Chohan
 Chugh
 Dall
 Dahot
 Dalwani
 Damani
 Dayo
 Dahar
 Abro 
 Depar
 Devero
 Deswali
 Dharejo
 Dolani
 Mirani
 Dudani
 Gehani

 Gajan
Dodeja

 Gangwani
 Ganglani
 Golani
 Griglani
Gulrajani
 Hala
 Hothi
 Hingorani
 Halapotra 
Hinduja
 Hotwani
Harwani
 Hashmi
 Hashmani
 Jesar
 Jamtani
 Jhaveri
 Johar                                                                                                                                                                                                                                                                                                                                                                                                                                                                                                                                                                                                                                                                                                                                                                                                     
 Jokhio
 Joyo
 Jogi
 Jobanputra
 Jarwar
 Junejo
Jumani
 Kakepota
 Kango
 Kamara (given name), Kamara (surname)
 Karira
 Katejs
Khakhan
 Kharal
 Kalhoro
 Kaura
 Kutchi
 Kambarzahi
 Keswani
 Keshwani
 Kodwani
 Khabrani
 Khanchandani
 Khemlani
 Kheskwani
 Kolhi
 Katariya 
 Kokal
 Khushalani
Kriplani
 Lalchandani
 leghari
 Lalwani
 Lanjwani
 Lakho
 Larik
 Laungani
 Lachhwani
 Lullitudwani
Ludhwani
 Lohana
 Laudwani
Maznani
 Mahar
 Magsi 
 Mangi
 Manghnani
 Mangnejo
 Mangwano
 Mansharamani
 Makhdoom
 Mamtani
 Mala
 Melwani

 Mirchandani
 Mirwani
 Memon
 Menik
 Sindhi Mallah
 Bohidar
 Motwani
 Mulchandani
 Nagdev
 Nandwani
 Narejo
 Narwani
 Nihalani
 Nankani
 Nathani
 Nagrani
 Neni
 Palh
 Pirzada
 Palijo
 Panjwani
 Pamnani
 Phull
 Punjabi
 Pursnani
 Qaimkhani
 Qazi
 Rahuma
 Rajper
 Ratlani
 Ramchandani
 Rupani
 Rajpal
 Rewri
 Rajai
 Rustamani
 Ruprela
 Sora
 Sodha
 Sainani
 Sambhavani
 Saand
 Sario
 Santdasani
 Samejo
 Sahita
 Shaikh
 Shari
 Solangi
 Sauvira (Shoro)
 Sihani
 Sindhi-Sipahi
 Soomro
 Soneji
 Samoo
 Siddique
 Sewani
 Theba
Tanwani
Tejani
Tejwani
Tunio
Thadhani
Thawani
 Tewani
 Tilokani
 Tirthani
 Wassan
 Waggan
 Sarki (tribe)
 Shar (شر)
Tharani
 Unad
 Vachani
 Vangani
 Varandani
Vishnani
 Vistro
Visrani
 Virwani
Valbani
Valecha
Vasandani
Vanvani
Varyani
Vaswani
Wadhwani
Vensiani
Solangi
Solanki
 Baat
Solangi tribes name 
Sozliyani 
Saliyani 
Muliyani 
Thariyani 
Babiani 
Kambherani 
Wariani 
Faridani 
Bachani
Lalwani
Ghunio گھنيو
 Vazirani
 Chandwani
 Jewani
 Tharwani
 Khiani
 Khilnani
Gidwani 
Ramnani
Murjani 
Rochani Bajeer

Kubar also 
|Sindhi]]
 List of Pakistani family names
 Pakistani name

References

External links
 Bherumal Mahirchand Advani, "Amilan-jo-Ahwal" - published in Sindhi, 1919
 Amilan-jo-Ahwal (1919) - translated into English in 2016 ("A History of the Amils") at sindhis

 
Family Names

Sindhi tribes
Sindhi culture
Sindhi people
Names by culture